The following is a list of Teen Choice Award winners and nominees for Choice Movie Actress – Sci-Fi/Fantasy. Formally awarded as two separate categories in 2010: Choice Movie Actress – Sci-Fi and Choice Movie Actress – Fantasy.

Winners/Nominees

2010s

References

Sci-Fi/Fantasy Actress
Awards for actresses